Surendra quercetorum, the common acacia blue, is  a species of lycaenid or blue butterfly found in the Indomalayan realm(in Simla Hills - Assam, Burma, South Bihaar, China, Vietnam).

The larvae feed on Acacia pennata and Acacia caesia.

Subspecies
 Surendra quercetorum quercetorum Moore, 1857 (S.Yunnan, Uttarakhand to N.E. India)
 Surendra quercetorum neritos Fruhstorfer, 1907 (Vietnam)

References

External links
 
 

Arhopalini
Butterflies described in 1857
Butterflies of Asia